Pixel Grip is an American electronic music group, formed in Chicago, Illinois. The band consists of vocalist Rita Lukea and producers Tyler Ommen and Jonathon Freund. The band has become known for their energetic live performances and their fusion of dark wave, minimal synth, and EBM with catchy pop hooks. The band is largely inspired by the queer music scene emerging from clubs and discos in last several decades.

References

Electronic music groups from Illinois
Musical groups from Chicago